Andriy Petrovych Oliynyk (born 5 August 1983) is a Ukrainian footballer playing as forward.

He became a top scorer of the 2010-11 Ukrainian Cup.

References
 
 
  

1983 births
Living people
Ukrainian footballers
FC Spartak Ivano-Frankivsk players
FC Prykarpattia Ivano-Frankivsk (2004) players
FC Naftovyk Dolyna players
FC Kalush players
FC Luzhany players
FC Karpaty Yaremche players
Ukrainian First League players
Ukrainian Second League players
Ukrainian Amateur Football Championship players
Ukrainian Cup top scorers
Association football forwards